Tokaj is a district in eastern part of Borsod-Abaúj-Zemplén County. Tokaj is also the name of the town where the district seat is found. The district is located in the Northern Hungary Statistical Region.

Geography 
Tokaj District borders with Gönc District to the north, Sárospatak District and Nyíregyháza District (Szabolcs-Szatmár-Bereg County) to the east, Tiszavasvári District (Szabolcs-Szatmár-Bereg County) to the south, Szerencs District to the west. The number of the inhabited places in Tokaj District is 11.

Municipalities 
The district has 1 town and 10 villages.
(ordered by population, as of 1 January 2012)

The bolded municipality is the city.

Demographics

In 2011, it had a population of 13,331 and the population density was 52/km².

Ethnicity
Besides the Hungarian majority, the main minority is the Roma (approx. 650).

Total population (2011 census): 13,331
Ethnic groups (2011 census): Identified themselves: 12,653 persons:
Hungarians: 11,848 (93.64%)
Gypsies: 620 (4.90%)
Others and indefinable: 185 (1.46%)
Approx. 500 persons in Tokaj District did not declare their ethnic group at the 2011 census.

Religion
Religious adherence in the county according to 2011 census:

Catholic – 5,655 (Roman Catholic – 4,655; Greek Catholic – 998); 
Reformed – 3,436;
Evangelical – 41;
other religions – 95; 
Non-religious – 1,096; 
Atheism – 89;
Undeclared – 2,919.

Gallery

See also
List of cities and towns of Hungary

References

External links
 Postal codes of the Tokaj District

Districts in Borsod-Abaúj-Zemplén County